The bantamweight was one of five boxing weight classes contested on the boxing at the 1908 Summer Olympics programme. Like all other boxing events, it was open only to men.  The boxing competitions were all held on October 27. The bantamweight was the lightest class, allowing boxers of up to 116 pounds (52.6 kg). Six boxers from two nations competed. Each NOC could enter up to 12 boxers. France entered 3 boxers, 2 of whom withdrew; Great Britain entered 5 boxers.

Competition format

There were three rounds in each bout, with the first two rounds being three minutes long and the last one going four minutes. Two judges scored the match, giving 5 points to the better boxer in each of the first two rounds and 7 to the better boxer in the third round. Marks were given to the other boxer in proportion to how well he did compared to the better. If the judges were not agreed on a winner at the end of the bout, the referee could either choose the winner or order a fourth round.

Results

Bracket

Did not start: R. Clément and A. Viez of France.

Quarterfinals

Condon won by knockout in the third round against the only non-British competitor in the bantamweight.  McGurk came out well against Thomas, but Thomas finished stronger.  The bout between Webb and Perry was the tightest, with Webb's win coming through the referee's decision after the two judges deadlocked.

Semifinals

Thomas had been seeded into a bye for the round.  Webb and Condon had a tight bout, with Condon winning narrowly.

Final

The two boxers fought a physical bout up close, in which Thomas fared better.

Standings

References

Sources
 Official Report of the Games of the IV Olympiad (1908).
 De Wael, Herman. Herman's Full Olympians: "Boxing 1908". Accessed 8 April 2006.

Bantamweight